Naomi Henrik (sometimes Noemi Hanreck) (June 11, 1920-March 23, 2018) was an Israeli sculptor.

Biography
Naomi Henrik was born in the city of Akkerman in Bessarabia to the family of gynecologist dr. Shaul Zellering (Russian: Цалеринг, Tzalering). In 1930 she and her family immigrated to the Land of Israel. 

She studied sculpture with Zeev Ben-Zvi in Jerusalem and in 1945 she moved to London to continue her studies in sculpture at the Slade School of Fine Art.

During World War II she met her future husband Ron, and they were married in 1945. They had daughter, Ruthie Henrik-Steinitz.

During 1971-1972 she headed the Artists' House in Jerusalem.

Naomi Henrik died at her home in Ein Kerem.

Work

1974: 

1967:  ("Monument for the Pathbreakers to Jerusalem")

In 1962 she won the competition for the monument at Yad Vashem "to symbolize the heroism of the Jews during the Holocaust" (The runner-up was Nathan Rapoport), but unfortunately her project was never realized and eventually in 1970 the Pillar of Heroism by Buky Schwartz was erected instead. 

She also devoted herself to works in mosaic.

Awards
1964: Defense Ministry Prize for War of Independence Monument
1965: Monument Design Prize, Yad Vashem, Jerusalem

References

Further reading
Esther Levinger, "Women and War Memorials in Israel", Woman’s Art Journal, vol. 16, no. 1 (1995), pp. 40–46. 

1920 births
2018 deaths

Israeli sculptors